Kubu Raya Regency or Great Kubu Regency is a regency of West Kalimantan, Indonesia.  It was created on 17 July 2007 from the (larger) central and southern part of Pontianak Regency. It covers an area of 6,985.24 km2, and it had a population of 500,970 at the 2010 Census and 609,392 at the 2020 Census; the official estimate as at mid 2021 was 615,125. The principal town lies at Sungai Raya, directly adjacent to the City of Pontianak. Despite its close location to Pontianak, the regional capital and economic centre of the West Kalimantan Province, Kubu Raya highly lacks sufficient infrastructure development, which causes general suspicions on the performance of its local government.

Administrative Districts 
The Kubu Raya Regency consists of nine districts (kecamatan), tabulated below with their areas and their populations at the 2010 Census and the 2020 Census, together with the official estimates as at mid 2021. The table includes the locations of the district administrative centres, the number of administrative villages (rural desa) in each district, and its post code.

Notes: (a) including the town (kelurahan) of Sungai Raya, which had 62,010 inhabitants at the 2010 Census; by the 2020 Census this town had been split into several desa within the district, among which the desa of Sungai Raya had 15,089 inhabitants at the 2020 Census. (b) except the desa of Kapur, which has a post code of 78234 and a population of 15,274 at the 2020 Census.

References

 
Regencies of West Kalimantan